Abū 'Abdullah Muḥammad ibn Sulaymān ibn Abū Bakr al-Jazūli al-Simlālī (d. 1465AD = 870AH), often known as Imam al-Jazuli or Sheikh Jazuli, was a Moroccan Sufi Saint. He is best known for compiling the Dala'il al-Khayrat, an extremely popular Muslim prayer book. This book is usually divided into 7 sections for each day of the week. Al-Jazuli is one of the seven saints of Marrakesh and is buried in his mausoleum inside the city.

Biography
Muhammad al-Jazuli claimed to be a Sharif (a descent of the Prophet of Islam, Muhammad) and  belonged to the Berber Jazulin tribe. He lived in the historic Sous area of Morocco, situated between the Atlantic Ocean and the Atlas Mountains, and studied locally before going to the Madrasat As-Saffarîn in Fez where his room is still pointed out to visitors today. In Fez he memorized works of usul al-fiqh and Maliki law, such as Ibn al-Hajib's Mukhtasr al-Far’i and Sahnun's Al-Mudawwana al-Kubra. He also met the famous jurist and mystic Ahmad Zarruq. After settling a tribal feud he left the area and spent the next forty years in Makkah, Medina and Jerusalem. After his long journey, he returned to Fez where he completed the prayer book Dala'il al-Khayrat.

He was initiated into the Shadhili Tariqa, a Sufi order, by a descendant of Abu Abdallah Mohammed Amghar, the sheikh of the Banu Amghar. He spent fourteen years in Khalwa (seclusion) and then went to Safi where he gathered around him many followers. The governor of Safi felt obliged to expel him and later poisoned him which led to his death in 1465. He is said to have died during prayer. His tomb in Afoughal became the center of the Saadi dynasty Saadian resistance against the Portuguese. His deep respect for al-Jazuli was the reason that Abu Abdallah al-Qaim chose Afoughal as his residence.

It is claimed that in 1541, seventy-seven years after his death, his body was exhumed to be transferred to Marrakesh and found to be uncorrupted. In the northern part of the Medina of Marrakesh the Saadi sultan Ahmad al-Araj (1517–1544) had a mausoleum built for al-Jazuli. The mausoleum was enlarged and partly rebuilt during the reign of the sultans Moulay Ismail and Mohammed Ben Abdallah.

See also
 List of Sufis
 Mohamed ben Issa, the son of one of his disciples who founded the Issawa order
 Qari Muhammad Muslehuddin Siddiqui
 Ahmed ou Musa (saint)

References

External links
 Mp3 Audio Recitation of Dala’il al-Khayrat and PDF translation and transliteration.
 Biography of Imam Sidi Mohammed b. Sulayman al-Jazouli
 The Story of Dala’il al-Khayrat (written by Sheikh Nuh Ha Mim Keller)

1465 deaths
Sunni Sufis
Moroccan Sufi writers
Shadhili order
15th-century Berber people
Year of birth unknown
People from Souss-Massa
15th-century Moroccan people
Berber Muslims
People from Safi, Morocco